Roberto Molina (born 28 January 2001) is a Salvadoran professional footballer who plays for USL Championship club Las Vegas Lights and the El Salvador national team.

Career

Youth 
Molina played with the USSDA Barca Residency academy for 3 years prior to attending college.

College 
In 2019, Molina attended the University of California, Irvine to play college soccer. In his freshman season, Molina made 19 appearances, scoring 3 goals and tallying 3 assists for the Anteaters. There was no 2020 season in the Big West Conference due to the COVID-19 pandemic.

Professional
On 5 April 2021, Molina was announced as a signing for USL Championship side Las Vegas Lights, opting to pursue a professional career and leaving college early. Molina made his professional debut on 5 May 2021, starting in a 5–0 loss to LA Galaxy II.

On 11 January 2022, Molina was selected 45th overall in the 2022 MLS SuperDraft by Colorado Rapids.

Personal
Molina was born in El Salvador, and raised in both Sonsonate and North Hollywood, California.

References

External links

UC Irvine bio

2001 births
Living people
People from Sonsonate Department
Salvadoran footballers
El Salvador international footballers
Association football forwards
Colorado Rapids draft picks
Las Vegas Lights FC players
People from North Hollywood, Los Angeles
Salvadoran expatriate footballers
Salvadoran expatriate sportspeople in the United States
Expatriate soccer players in the United States
UC Irvine Anteaters men's soccer players
USL Championship players